Rumailah is an archaeological site in Al Ain, United Arab Emirates, as well as the site of a thick-walled coral and adobe fort, thought to date to the early 20th century.

Located three kilometres west of Hili Archaeological Park, the rectangular mound at Rumailah is thought to have been home to populations dating back to the late Umm Al Nar period, yielding buildings and artefacts from a more recent, major Iron Age II settlement dated from around 1,100–500 BCE.

Archaeology 
Finds at Rumailah include distinctive pottery adorned with snake patterns, similar to finds at Qusais, Masafi and the major Iron and Bronze Ages; metallurgical production centre at Saruq Al Hadid, as well as chlorite vessels decorated with turtles alternating with trees, similar to finds from Qidfa' in Fujairah, Qusais in Dubai and Al-Hajar in Bahrain. A number of Iron Age swords and axe-heads, as well as distinctive seal moulds, were also recovered from the site. A number of bronze arrowheads were also found at the site. The Iron Age buildings found at Rumailah are typical of those found in the region, at Iron Age I and II sites such as Thuqeibah and Muweilah, with a number of row dwellings, although lacking the perimeter walls found at Thuqeibah. A columned hall at Rumailah provides a further link to Muweilah, while a number of pyramidal seals found at Rumailah find an echo with similar objects discovered at Bidaa Bint Saud.

See also 
 List of Ancient Settlements in the UAE
 Iron Age in the United Arab Emirates
Archaeology of the United Arab Emirates
 Bidaa Bint Saud
 Qattara Oasis

References 

Al-Rumailah, UAE
Archaeological sites in the United Arab Emirates
History of the Emirate of Abu Dhabi
History of the United Arab Emirates
Archaeology of the United Arab Emirates